Sakam, or Kutong, is one of the Finisterre languages of Papua New Guinea. It is the most divergent of its cluster, the Uruwa languages. It is spoken in Kamdaran, Makwa, Sakam, and Tamunat villages of Dinangat ward, Yus Rural LLG, Morobe Province.

References

Finisterre languages
Languages of Morobe Province